Arifin Shuvoo (born 2 February 1982) is a Bangladeshi film actor and television personality. He is the recipient of several awards and nominations, including a National Film Award and two Meril Prothom Alo Awards. He made his debut in 2007, appearing in the television series Ha/Na before appearing in his first film Jaago - Dare To Dream in 2010.

He made a debut into mainstream cinema with Purno Doirgho Prem Kahini in 2013. For his negative role in the film, he received a nomination for Best Actor at the Meril Prothom Alo Awards. He later went on to star in Bhalobasha Zindabad in 2013 and the romantic action film Agnee in 2014. In 2015, his performance in Chuye Dile Mon earned him his first Meril Prothom Alo Award for Best Actor. He later starred in the film Musafir directed by Ashiqur Rahman in 2016. In 2017, he starred in Dhaka Attack directed by Dipankar Dipon. In 2021 he starred in Mission Extreme Directed by Sunny Sanowar & Faisal Ahmed. His upcoming projects are Mujib: The Making of a Nation, Noor ,  & Football 71

Career

2007–2009: Television
Before working in television, Shuvoo worked in television commercials. He made his acting debut in 2007, with appearance in Mostofa Sarwar Farooki's television series Ha/Na in 2007, where he had a recurring role. He also had a recurring role in the show Iz Equal Two in 2008.

He then starred in the television series Serious Ekta Kotha Ache alongside Mosharraf Karim and Sohana Saba. His performance was praised by critics. Another critically praised performance of his was in the show Lilaboti. He continued in television until 2009 before starring in his debut film Jaago - Dare To Dream.

2009–2013: Debut and Breakthrough
Shuvo made his film debut in 2010 with Khijir Hayat Khan's sports drama film Jaago - Dare To Dream, starring alongside Ferdous and Bindu. He made his breakthrough in Shafi Uddin Shafi's Purno Doirgho Prem Kahini by starring alongside Jaya Ahsan and Shakib Khan, where he played the antagonist. The film was a huge success commercially and his performance was highly praised by critics, earning him a Best Actor nomination at the Meril Prothom Alo Awards. He next starred in Debashish Biswas Bhalobasha Zindabad alongside Airin Sultana.

2014–present: Critical Acclaim
In 2014, Shuvo was first seen in Iftakar Chowdhury's action thriller Agnee, alongside Mahiya Mahi. He next started in Mohammad Mostafa Kamal Raz's Taarkata, which received mixed to negative reviews from critics and received a mixed reaction from the audience. The film was a commercial failure. His next project, Ashiqur Rahman's Kistimaat, co-starring Achol, where he plays the role of a cop, was a huge success at box office and was critically a success. The film was one of the highest-grossing films of 2014.

In 2015, he starred in Shihab Shaheen's romantic drama film Chuye Dile Mon, alongside Zakia Bari Momo. The film and his performance was highly appreciated by both critics and audience, earning Shuvo his first Meril Prothom Alo award for Best Actor He next went on to star in Shafi Uddin Shafi's Warning alongside Mahiya Mahi and Rubel. The film was a moderate success commercially.

In 2016, Shuvo starred in Ashiqur Rahman's Musafir. He then starred in Anonno Mamun's Ostitto which released in May 2016. He also starred in the Indo-Bangladeshi joint venture Niyoti, which directed by Zakir Hossain Raju and was produced by Jaaz Multimedia and Eskay Movies. He then played a cameo in Amitabh Reza Chowdhury's Aynabaji which released in 30 September 2016.

In 2017, Shuvoo began the year with Zakir Hossain Raju's Premi O Premi and Shamim Ahamed Roni's Dhat Teri Ki, both being produced by Jaaz Multimedia and co-starring Nusrat Faria Mazhar. Regarding the former, the film and Shuvoo's performance were critically acclaimed. Shuvoo also gave the voiceover for the first animated film of Bangladesh Detective, directed by Tapan Ahmed. Later he acted in the film Dhaka Attack which was a huge blockbuster in the box office. The film was directed by Dipankar Dipon. The film was the highest-grossing Bangladeshi film of 2017 & still, it is the third highest-grossing Bangladeshi film of all time. And it is also the highest-grossing Bangladeshi film worldwide.

In 2018, Shuvoo started the year with Zakir Hossain Raju's Bhalo Theko produced by 'Tiger Media' co-starring Tanha Tasnia Islam and Asif Imrose. Though the story of this film was good enough, Shuvoo received negative reviews from the critics for acting in this film. Next, he then starred in renowned film actor Alamgir's Ekti Cinemar Golpo, co-starring  Rituparna Sengupta and Alamgir. The film was a commercial failure.

In 2019, Shuvoo started the year with Ranjan Ghosh's Ahaa Re co-starring Rituparna Sengupta which is completely an Indian Bengali film. His most recent work is in Shapludu, a political thriller film directed by Golam Sohrab Dodul, where he portrayed the character of Arman. The movie was released on 27 September 2019. 

In 2021, Shuvoo started the year with Sunny Sanwar and Faisal Ahmed's Police action-thriller film Mission Extreme, where he played the character of Nabid Al Shahriar, Additional Deputy Commissioner of Police (ADC), CTTC. The movie was released on 03 December 2021 and also finished the second part of Mission Extreme, named Mission Extreme 2: Black War which will be released on 06 January 2023. He will also next starring in Bangabandhu Sheikh Mujibur Rahman's biopic Mujib: The Making of a Nation, Raihan Rafi's Noor, produced by Shapla Media and Noyeem Imtiaz Neyamul's Jam, which is about a traffic jam and produced by Dhallywood Cinema Megastar Manna's Kritanjoli Kothachitra.

Personal life
Arifin married to Arpita Samaddar who is a fashion designer from India and works for a multinational company in Dhaka.

Filmography

Unreleased and dropped films

Television

Web series

Awards and nominations

References

External links

 
 
 

Living people
21st-century Bangladeshi male actors
Bangladeshi male film actors
Best Actor National Film Award (Bangladesh) winners
People from Bhaluka Upazila
1982 births
People from Mymensingh District